The Battle of Lubartów, which took place in the night of January 22–23, 1863, was one of the first battles of the January Uprising. Several hundred Polish insurgents, mostly scythemen and some armed with sticks, planned to attack the town of Lubartów, Congress Poland, which was garrisoned by the Imperial Russian Army. Furthermore, the Poles wanted to capture the nearby hamlet of Skrobów, where Russian artillery cannons were kept.

The attack on Skrobów failed, and Russian sentries, who fled to Lubartów, warned their officers. The insurgents thus lost the element of surprise, and their action was repulsed. After losing some men, the rebels withdrew to the nearby forests.

Sources 
 J. Tomczyk, Lubartów w powstaniu styczniowym, [w:] Lubartów.

Lubartow
Conflicts in 1863
Lubartow
January 1863 events
Lublin Governorate